Kenny Thompson (born 26 April 1985) is a Belgian football player who is currently playing for Nijlen in the Belgian Third Amateur Division.

Honours 
 K.A.A. Gent
 Belgian Cup (1): 2009–10

References

External links
 

1985 births
Living people
Belgian footballers
Beerschot A.C. players
Lierse S.K. players
K.S.V. Roeselare players
K.A.A. Gent players
Oud-Heverlee Leuven players
Belgian Pro League players
Challenger Pro League players
People from Deurne, Belgium
K Beerschot VA players
Association football defenders
Footballers from Antwerp